Dart Island, part of the Tasman Island Group, lies close to the south-eastern coast of Tasmania, Australia. It is located in Norfolk Bay, situated off the Tasman Peninsula.

Dart Island is a state reserve.  If contains stands of blackwoods, allocasuarinas and eucalypts.  Rabbits are present and cause browsing damage to the vegetation.

See also

 List of islands of Tasmania

References

Islands of Tasmania
South East coast of Tasmania
Islands of Australia (Tenure: State Reserve)